Frederick, Duke of Lorraine may refer to:
 Frederick I, Duke of Lorraine
 Frederick II, Duke of Lorraine
 Frederick III, Duke of Lorraine
 Frederick IV, Duke of Lorraine